The Croix de Gasperich is a motorway interchange in Luxembourg City, in southern Luxembourg.  It is the junction between three of Luxembourg's six motorways: the western terminus of the A1 continues seamlessly as it meets the eastern terminus of the A6, whilst the A3 passes underneath the two on its way from Luxembourg City to Dudelange.  It lies in the Gasperich quarter, in the south of the city, hence its name.

External links
  Administration des Ponts et Chaussées webpage on the Croix de Gasperich

Road interchanges in Luxembourg
Transport in Luxembourg City